Finghall railway station is on the Wensleydale Railway and serves the village of Finghall in North Yorkshire, England. Adjacent to the station is a manually operated gated crossing on the single-track Wensleydale Railway.

The station was opened as Finghall Lane by the Bedale and Leyburn Railway on 19 May 1856. It was closed in April 1954, but was used sporadically between 1984 and 1988 for detraining passengers on DalesRail services. The station was used in the 1970s and 1980s by the BBC Television series All Creatures Great and Small, renamed as "Rainby Halt" for the show, with the signboard advising passengers bound for Darrowby to "alight here"; no passenger trains called at the station during that time.

The station was reopened by the Wensleydale Railway on 23 December 2004 after being closed for half a century. 

Currently, trains operate on a request-stop basis, whereby if there are passengers on the platform then the train will halt, but if there are no passengers the train will continue through without stopping. Passengers wishing to alight at Finghall must inform a member of the train crew and they will take action to ensure the train stops at the station. Only two or three out of the ten trains a day actually halt at Finghall, and often this is just to ensure good timekeeping.

References

External links
Video footage of Finghall Lane railway station

Heritage railway stations in North Yorkshire
Wensleydale
Railway stations in Great Britain opened in 1856
Railway stations in Great Britain closed in 1954
Railway stations in Great Britain opened in 2004
Former North Eastern Railway (UK) stations